Amsterdam Island is an island in the Tambrauw in Southwest Papua province of eastern Indonesia. Part of the Su Islands (Mios Su) or the Soe Island Group.

See also
Middleburg Island

References

External links
 Pacific Wrecks website

Islands of Western New Guinea
Southwest Papua
Tambrauw Regency